The DBAG Class 611 is a two car, tilting, diesel multiple unit operated by Deutsche Bahn for fast regional rail services on unelectrified lines.

General information 

Class 611, successor to the DB Class 610, was developed using tilting systems from German military technology in favour of the Hydraulic Fiat systems used by its predecessor Because of environmental concerns over the potential hazards of leaking hydraulic fluid an electrically actuated option based on equipment used to keep the guns of tanks level while traversing uneven terrain was used. The Class 611 suffered teething troubles following its entry into service just two years after the contract was awarded and was largely considered a failure. However, 40 are still in use as of November 2015.

Tilting technology issues 
The trains came into service in 1996 and by March 1997 the first problems with the tilting technology occurred. The Federal Railway Authority limited the Class 611 to 120 km/h and required the tilting technology to be disabled, this was only reversed in May 1999 when they were satisfied the issues had been resolved. The tilting was disabled again in August 2004 when cracks were found in the 611's successors wheel sets, the DBAG Class 612, during ultrasound examinations of the axles. Tilting was disabled and speed limits on curved tracks were reduced until 2006 when the problematic wheel sets were replaced. However further issues were experienced and in October 2009, the tilting technology was disabled once again. Since April 3, 2011, Class 611 trainsets have been used in Baden-Württemberg with tilting technology enabled once more.

See also
 List of Deutsche Bahn AG locomotives and railbuses

References

Diesel multiple units of Germany
Tilting trains
611
Adtranz multiple units
1996 in rail transport